Suetsugu (written: 末次 or 末續) is a Japanese surname. Notable people with the surname include:

, Imperial Japanese Navy admiral
, Japanese sprinter
, Japanese baseball player
, Japanese manga artist

Japanese-language surnames